Drepanophiletis is a genus of moths of the family Erebidae. The genus was erected by George Hampson in 1926.

Species
Drepanophiletis castaneata Hampson, 1926
Drepanophiletis hypocaloides Holland, 1894
Drepanophiletis siderosticta Holland, 1894

References

Calpinae